The Pau Oco State Park is a state park in the state of Paraná, Brazil.
It protects an area of Atlantic Forest.
The main attraction is the Salto da Fortuna, a waterfall.

Location

It is part of the Lagamar Mosaic.
The park contains the Salto da Fortuna, a waterfall that may be reached by a trail taking about four hours round trip.
A local guide is required.
The trail is of medium difficulty, crosses rivers, and includes sections and ruins of the old Arraial Colonial Route, now replaced by BR-277.
The Arraial Colonial Way was opened between 1586 and 1590.
There is an old chapel used by the miners of that time to request protection on their expeditions into the Serra do Mar.

History

The Pau Oco State Park was created by state governor decree 4266 of 21 November 1994.
The land was owned by the Environmental Institute of Paraná (IAP), who was responsible for promoting preservation of the water, flora and fauna.
Two years were allowed for preparation of the management plan, which was to be integrated with the Marumbi Special Area of Tourist Interest.
The park is classed IUCN protected area category II (national park), with the basic objective of preserving the ecosystems.

Notes

Sources

State parks of Brazil
Protected areas of Paraná (state)
1994 establishments in Brazil